The Syriac language (/ ), also known as Syriac Aramaic (Syrian Aramaic, Syro-Aramaic) and Classical Syriac ܠܫܢܐ ܥܬܝܩܐ (in its literary and liturgical form), is an Aramaic dialect that emerged during the first century AD from a local Aramaic dialect that was spoken in the ancient region of Osroene, centered in the city of Edessa. During the Early Christian period, it became the main literary language of various Aramaic-speaking Christian communities in the historical region of Ancient Syria and throughout the Near East. As a liturgical language of Syriac Christianity, it gained a prominent role among Eastern Christian communities that used both Eastern Syriac and Western Syriac rites. Following the spread of Syriac Christianity, it also became a liturgical language of eastern Christian communities as far as India and China. It flourished from the 4th to the 8th century, and continued to have an important role during the next centuries, but by the end of the Middle Ages it was gradually reduced to liturgical use, since the role of vernacular language among its native speakers was overtaken by several emerging Neo-Aramaic dialects.

Classical Syriac is written in the Syriac alphabet, a derivation of the Aramaic alphabet. The language is preserved in a large body of Syriac literature, that comprises roughly 90% of the extant Aramaic literature. Along with Greek and Latin, Syriac became one of the three most important languages of Early Christianity. Already from the first and second centuries AD, the inhabitants of the region of Osroene began to embrace Christianity, and by the third and fourth centuries, local Edessan Aramaic language became the vehicle of the specific Christian culture that came to be known as the Syriac Christianity. Because of theological differences, Syriac-speaking Christians diverged during the 5th century into the Church of the East that followed the East Syriac Rite under the Persian rule, and the Syriac Orthodox Church that followed the West Syriac Rite under the Byzantine rule.

As a liturgical language of Syriac Christianity, Classical Syriac language spread throughout Asia as far as the South Indian Malabar Coast, and Eastern China, and became the medium of communication and cultural dissemination for the later Arabs, and (to a lesser extent) the other peoples of Parthian and Sasanian empires. Primarily a Christian medium of expression, Syriac had a fundamental cultural and literary influence on the development of Arabic, which largely replaced it during the later medieval period.

Syriac remains the sacred language of Syriac Christianity to this day. It is used as liturgical language of several denominations, like those who follow the East Syriac Rite, including the Assyrian Church of the East, the Ancient Church of the East, the Chaldean Catholic Church, the Syro-Malabar Catholic Church, and the Assyrian Pentecostal Church, and also those who follow the West Syriac Rite, including: Syriac Orthodox Church, the Syriac Catholic Church, the Maronite Catholic Church, the Malankara Mar Thoma Syrian Church, the Malankara Orthodox Syrian Church and the Syro-Malankara Catholic Church. In its contemporary spoken forms, it is known as leshono kthobonoyo or kthobonoyo.

Name

In the English language, the term "Syriac" is used as a linguonym (language name) designating a specific variant of the Aramaic language in relation to its regional origin in northeastern parts of Ancient Syria, around Edessa, that lay outside of provincial borders of Roman Syria. Since Aramaic was used throughout the Near East, having several variants (dialects), this specific dialect that originated in northeastern Syria became known under its regional (Syrian/Syriac) designation (Suryaya).

In English scholarly literature, the term "Syriac" is preferred over the alternative form "Syrian" since the latter is much more polysemic and commonly relates to Syria in general. That distinction is used in English as a convention and does not exist on the ancient endonymic level. Several compound terms like "Syriac Aramaic", "Syrian Aramaic" or "Syro-Aramaic" are also used, thus emphasizing both the Aramaic nature of the language and its Syrian/Syriac regional origin.

Endonyms and exonyms

Early native speakers and writers used several endonymic terms as designations for their language. In addition to common endonym (native name) for the Aramaic language in general (Aramaya), another endonymic term was also used, designating more specifically the local Edessan dialect, known as Urhaya, a term derived directly from the native Aramaic name for the city of Edessa (Urhay). Among similar endonymic names with regional connotations, term Nahraya was also used. It was derived from choronym (regional name) Bet-Nahrain, an Aramaic name for Mesopotamia in general.

Original endonymic (native) designations, for Aramaic in general (Aramaya), and Edessan Aramaic in particular (Urhaya), were later (starting from the 5th century) accompanied by another term, exonymic (foreign) in origin: Suryaya (Syrian/Syriac), adopted under the influence of a long-standing Greek custom of referring to Arameans as Syrians. Among ancient Greeks, term "Syrian language" was used as a common designation for Aramaic language in general, and such usage was also reflected in Aramaic, by subsequent (acquired) use of the term "Suryaya" as the most preferred synonym for "Aramaya" (Aramaic).

Practice of interchangeable naming (Aramaya, Urhaya, Nahraya, and Suryaya) persisted for centuries, in common use and also in works of various prominent writers. One of those who used various terms was theologian Jacob of Edessa (d. 708), who was referring to the language as "Syrian or Aramean" (Suryāyā awkēt Ārāmāyā), and also as Urhāyā, when referring to Edessan Aramaic, or Naḥrāyā when pointing to the region of Bet-Nahrain (Aramaic term for Mesopotamia in general).

Plurality of terms among native speakers (ārāmāyā, urhāyā, naḥrāyā, and suryāyā) was not reflected in Greek and Latin terminology, that preferred Syrian/Syriac designation, and the same preference was adopted by later scholars, with one important distinction: in western scholarly use, Syrian/Syriac label was subsequently reduced from the original Greek designation for Aramaic language in general to a more specific (narrower) designation for Edessan Aramaic language, that in its literary and liturgical form came to be known as Classical Syriac. That reduction resulted in the creation of a specific field of Syriac studies, within Aramaic studies.

Preference of early scholars towards the use of the Syrian/Syriac label was also relied upon its notable use as an alternative designation for Aramaic language in the "Cave of Treasures", long held to be the 4th century work of an authoritative writer and revered Christian saint Ephrem of Edessa (d. 373), who was thus believed to be proponent of various linguistic notions and tendencies expressed in the mentioned work. Since modern scholarly analyses have shown that the work in question was written much later ( 600) by an unknown author, several questions had to be reexamined. In regard to the scope and usage of Syrian/Syriac labels in linguistic terminology, some modern scholars have noted that diversity of Aramaic dialects in the wider historical region of Syria should not be overlooked by improper and unspecific use of Syrian/Syriac labels.

Diversity of Aramaic dialects was recorded by Theodoret of Cyrus (d.  466), who accepted Syrian/Syriac labels as common Greek designations for Arameans and their language in general, stating that "the Osroënians, the Syrians, the people of the Euphrates, the Palestinians, and the Phoenicians all speak Syriac, but with many differences in pronunciation". Theodoret′s regional (provincial) differentiation of Aramaic dialects included an explicit distinction between the "Syrians" (as Aramaic speakers of Syria proper, western of Euphrates), and the "Osroenians" as Aramaic speakers of Osroene (eastern region, centered in Edessa), thus showing that dialect of the "Syrians" (Aramaic speakers of proper Syria) was known to be different from that of the "Osroenians" (speakers of Edessan Aramaic).

Native (endonymic) use of the term Aramaic language (Aramaya/Oromoyo) among its speakers has continued throughout the medieval period, as attested by the works of prominent writers, including the Oriental Orthodox Patriarch Michael of Antioch (d. 1199).

Wider and narrower meanings

Since the proper dating of the Cave of Treasures, modern scholars were left with no indications of native Aramaic adoption of Syrian/Syriac labels before the 5th century. In the same time, a growing body of later sources showed that both in Greek, and in native literature, those labels were most commonly used as designations for Aramaic language in general, including its various dialects (both eastern and western), thus challenging the conventional scholarly reduction of the term "Syriac language" to a specific designation for Edessan Aramaic. Such use, that excludes non-Edessan dialects, and particularly those of Western Aramaic provenience, persist as an accepted convention, but in the same time stands in contradiction both with original Greek, and later native (acquired) uses of Syrian/Syriac labels as common designations for Aramaic language in general.

Those problems were addressed by prominent scholars, including Theodor Nöldeke (d. 1930) who noted on several occasions that term "Syriac language" has come to have two distinctive meanings, wider and narrower, with first (historical and wider) serving as a common synonym for Aramaic language in general, while other (conventional and narrower) designating only the Edessan Aramaic, also referred to more specifically as the "Classical Syriac".

Noting the problem, scholars have tried to resolve the issue by being more consistent in their use of the term "Classical Syriac" as a strict and clear scientific designation for the old literary and liturgical language, but the consistency of such use was never achieved within the field.

Inconsistent use of "Syrian/Syriac" labels in scholarly literature has led some researchers to raise additional questions, related not only to terminological issues but also to some more fundamental (methodological) problems, that were undermining the integrity of the field. Attempts to resolve those issues were unsuccessful, and in many scholarly works, related to the old literary and liturgical language, reduction of the term "Classical Syriac" to "Syriac" (only) remained a manner of convenience, even in titles of works, including encyclopedic entries, thus creating a large body of unspecific references, that became a base for the emergence of several new classes of terminological problems at the advent of the informational era. Those problems culminated during the process of international standardization of the terms "Syriac" and "Classical Syriac" within the ISO 639 and MARC systems.

The term "Classical Syriac" was accepted in 2007 and codified (ISO code: syc) as a designation for the old literary and liturgical language, thus confirming the proper use of the term. In the same time, within the MARC standard, code syc was accepted as designation for Classical Syriac, but under the name "Syriac", while the existing general code syr, that was until then named "Syriac", was renamed to "Syriac, Modern". Within ISO 639 system, large body of unspecific references related to various linguistic uses of the term "Syriac" remained related to the original ISO 639-2 code syr (Syriac), but its scope is defined within the ISO 639-3 standard as a macrolanguage that currently includes only some of the Neo-Aramaic languages. Such differences in classification, both terminological and substantial, within systems and between systems (ISO and MARC), led to the creation of several additional problems, that remain unresolved.

Within linguistics, mosaic of terminological ambiguities related to Syrian/Syriac labels was additionally enriched by introduction of the term "Palaeo-Syrian language" as a variant designation for the ancient Eblaite language from the third millennium BC, that is unrelated to the much later Edessan Aramaic, and its early phases, that were commonly labeled as Old/Proto- or even Paleo/Palaeo-Syrian/Syriac in scholarly literature. Newest addition to the terminological mosaic occurred  2014, when it was proposed, also by a scholar, that one of regional dialects of the Old Aramaic language from the first centuries of the 1st millennium BC should be called "Central Syrian Aramaic", thus introducing another ambiguous term, that can be used, in its generic meaning, to any local variant of Aramaic that occurred in central regions of Syria during any period in history.

After more than five centuries of Syriac studies, that were founded by western scholars by the end of the 15th century, main terminological issues related to the name and classification of the language known as Edessan Aramaic, and also referred to by several other names combined of Syrian/Siriac labels, remain opened and unsolved. Some of those issues have special sociolinguistic and ethnolinguistic significance for the remaining Neo-Aramaic speaking communities.

Since the occurrence of major political changes in the Near East (2003), those issues have acquired additional complexity, related to legal recognition of the language and its name. In the Constitution of Iraq (Article 4), adopted in 2005, and also in subsequent legislation, term "Syriac" is used as official designation for the language of Neo-Aramaic-speaking communities, thus opening additional questions related to linguistic and cultural identity of those communities. Legal and other practical (educational and informational) aspects of the linguistic self-identification also arose throughout Syriac-speaking diaspora, particularly in European countries (Germany, Sweden, Netherlands).

Geographic distribution

Syriac was the local dialect of Aramaic in Edessa, and evolved under the influence of the Church of the East and the Syriac Orthodox Church into its current form. Before Arabic became the dominant language, Syriac was a major language among Christian communities in the Middle East, Central Asia and the Malabar Coast in India, and remains so among the Syriac Christians to this day. It has been found as far afield as Hadrian's Wall in Great Britain, with inscriptions written by Aramaic-speaking soldiers of the Roman Empire.

History

History of Syriac language is divided into several successive periods, defined primarily by linguistic, and also by cultural criteria. Some terminological and chronological distinctions exist between different classifications, that were proposed among scholars.

 "Old Syriac" (Old-Edessan Aramaic), represents the earliest stage in development of the language, that emerged by the beginning of the first century AD as the main Aramaic dialect in the region of Osroene, centered in Edessa, and continued to develop during the next two or three centuries, gradually gaining wider regional significance.
 "Middle Syriac" (Middle-Edessan Aramaic), most commonly known as "Classical Syriac" or "Literary Syriac", represents the most important period in the history of the language, marked by notable literary, liturgical and cultural development and expansion, from the third to the thirteenth century. The period is further subdivided into three stages:
 Early Classical Syriac (Pre-Classical Syriac), represents the earliest stage in development of Classical Syriac during the third and fourth century, preceding the later linguistic standardization.
 Classical Syriac (in the narrower sense of the term), represents the main, standardized stage in development of Classical Syriac, from the fourth century up to the eighth century.
 Late Classical Syriac (Post-Classical Syriac), represents the later, somewhat declining stage in development of Classical Syriac, from the eighth century up to the twelfth or thirteenth century.
 "Modern Syriac" (Neo-Syriac Aramaic) represents modern Neo-Aramaic languages. Neo-Syriac languages did not develop directly from Classical Syriac, but rather from closely related dialects belonging to the same branch of Aramaic. Those dialects have long co-existed with Classical Syriac as a liturgical and literary language, and were significantly influenced by it during the late medieval and early modern period. Modern Syriac is divided into:
 Modern Eastern Syriac (Northeastern Neo-Aramaic), including primarily Assyrian Neo-Aramaic and Chaldean Neo-Aramaic. The term is usually not used in reference to Neo-Mandaic, another variety of Eastern Aramaic spoken by the Mandaeans.
 Modern Western Syriac (Central Neo-Aramaic), including (Turoyo and Mlahsô).

Origins 

During the first three centuries of the Common Era, a local Aramaic dialect that was spoken in the Kingdom of Osroene, centered in Edessa, eastern of Euphrates, started to gain prominence and regional significance. There are about eighty extant early inscriptions, written in Old-Edessan Aramaic, dated to the first three centuries AD, with the earliest inscription being dated to the 6th year AD, and the earliest parchment to 243 AD. All of these early examples of the language are non-Christian. As a language of public life and administration in the region of Osroene, Edessan Aramaic was gradually given a relatively coherent form, style and grammar that is lacking in other Aramaic dialects of the same period. Since Old-Edessan Aramaic later developed into Classical Syriac, it was retroactively labeled (by western scholars) as "Old Syrian/Syriac" or "Proto-Syrian/Syriac", although the linguistic homeland of the language (region of Osroene) was never part of contemporary (Roman) Syria.

Literary Syriac 

In the 3rd century, churches in Edessa began to use local Aramaic dialect as the language of worship. Early literary efforts were focused on creation of an authoritative Aramaic translation of the Bible, the Peshitta. At the same time, Ephrem the Syrian was producing the most treasured collection of poetry and theology in the Edessan Aramaic language, that later became known as Syriac.

In 489, many Syriac-speaking Christians living in the eastern reaches of the Roman Empire fled to the Sasanian Empire to escape persecution and growing animosity with Greek-speaking Christians. The Christological differences with the Church of the East led to the bitter Nestorian Schism in the Syriac-speaking world. As a result, Syriac developed distinctive western and eastern varieties. Although remaining a single language with a high level of comprehension between the varieties, the two employ distinctive variations in pronunciation and writing system, and, to a lesser degree, in vocabulary.

The Syriac language later split into a western variety, used mainly by the Syriac Orthodox Church in upper Mesopotamia and Syria proper, and an eastern variety used mainly by the Church of the East in central and northeastern Mesopotamia. Religious divisions were also reflected in linguistic differences between the Western Syriac Rite and the Eastern Syriac Rite. During the 5th and the 6th century, Syriac reached its height as the lingua franca of Mesopotamia and surrounding regions. It existed in literary (liturgical) form, as well as in vernacular forms, as the native language of Syriac-speaking populations.

Following the Arab conquest in the 7th century, vernacular forms of Syriac were gradually replaced during the next centuries by the advancing Arabic language. Having an Aramaic (Syriac) substratum, the regional Arabic dialect (Mesopotamian Arabic) developed under the strong influence of local Aramaic (Syriac) dialects, sharing significant similarities in language structure, as well as having evident and stark influences from previous (ancient) languages of the region.
Syriac-influenced Arabic dialects developed among Iraqi Muslims, as well as Iraqi Christians, most of whom descend from native Syriac speakers.

Western Syriac is the official language of the West Syriac Rite, practiced by the Syriac Orthodox Church, the Syriac Catholic Church, the Maronite Catholic Church, the Malankara Orthodox Syrian Church, the Malabar Independent Syrian Church, the Malankara Mar Thoma Syrian Church and the Syro-Malankara Catholic Church.

Eastern Syriac is the liturgical language of the East Syriac Rite, practised in modern times by the ethnic Assyrian followers of the Assyrian Church of the East, the Assyrian Pentecostal Church, the Ancient Church of the East, the Chaldean Catholic Church, as well as the Syro-Malabar Catholic Church in India.

Syriac literature is by far the most prodigious of the various Aramaic languages. Its corpus covers poetry, prose, theology, liturgy, hymnody, history, philosophy, science, medicine and natural history. Much of this wealth remains unavailable in critical editions or modern translation.

From the 7th century onwards, Syriac gradually gave way to Arabic as the spoken language of much of the region, excepting northern Iraq. The Mongol invasions and conquests of the 13th century, and the religiously motivated massacres of Syriac Christians by Timur further contributed to the rapid decline of the language. In many places outside of Upper Mesopotamia, even in liturgy, it was replaced by Arabic.

Current status 

Revivals of literary Syriac in recent times have led to some success with the creation of newspapers in written Syriac similar to the use of Modern Standard Arabic has been employed since the early decades of the 20th century. Modern forms of literary Syriac has also been used not only in religious literature but also in secular genres, often with Assyrian nationalistic themes.

Syriac is spoken as the liturgical language of the Syriac Orthodox Church, as well as by some of its adherents. Syriac has been recognised as an official minority language in Iraq. It is also taught in some public schools in Iraq, Syria, Palestine, Israel, Sweden, Augsburg (Germany) and Kerala (India).

In 2014, an Assyrian nursery school could finally be opened in Yeşilköy, Istanbul after waging a lawsuit against the Ministry of National Education which had denied it permission, but was required to respect non-Muslim minority rights as specified in the Treaty of Lausanne.

In August 2016, the Ourhi Centre was founded by the Assyrian community in the city of Qamishli, to educate teachers in order to make Syriac an additional language to be taught in public schools in the Jazira Region of the Autonomous Administration of North and East Syria, which then started with the 2016/17 academic year.

Grammar
Many Syriac words, like those in other Semitic languages, belong to triconsonantal roots, collations of three Syriac consonants. New words are built from these three consonants with variable vowel and consonant sets. For example, the following words belong to the root , to which a basic meaning of taking can be assigned:

  – : "he has taken"
  – : "he will take, he was taking, he does take"
  – : "take!"
  – : "he takes, he is taking"
  – : "he has lifted/raised"
  – : "he has set out"
  – : "a taking, burden, recension, portion or syllable"
  – : "takings, profits, taxes"
  – : "a beast of burden"
  – : "arrogance"

Nouns 
Most Syriac nouns are built from triliteral roots. Nouns carry grammatical gender (masculine or feminine), they can be either singular or plural in number (a very few can be dual) and can exist in one of three grammatical states. These states should not be confused with grammatical cases in other languages.

However, very quickly in the development of Classical Syriac, the emphatic state became the ordinary form of the noun, and the absolute and construct states were relegated to certain stock phrases (for example, "man, person", literally "son of man").

In Old and early Classical Syriac, most genitive noun relationships are built using the construct state, but contrary to the genitive case, it is the head-noun which is marked by the construct state. Thus, means "the taxes of the kingdom". Quickly, the construct relationship was abandoned and replaced by the use of the relative particle , . Very closely related nouns can be drawn into a closer grammatical relationship by the addition of a pronominal suffix. In this case, both nouns continue to be in the emphatic state, but the first has the suffix that makes it literally read "her taxes" ("kingdom" is feminine), and thus is "her taxes, [those] of the kingdom".

Adjectives always agree in gender and number with the nouns they modify. Adjectives are in the absolute state if they are predicative, but agree with the state of their noun if attributive.

Verbs 
Most Syriac verbs are built on triliteral roots as well. Finite verbs carry person, gender (except in the first person) and number, as well as tense and conjugation. The non-finite verb forms are the infinitive and the active and passive participles.

Syriac has only two true morphological tenses: perfect and imperfect. Whereas these tenses were originally aspectual in Aramaic, they have become a truly temporal past and future tenses respectively. The present tense is usually marked with the participle followed by the subject pronoun. However, such pronouns are usually omitted in the case of the third person. This use of the participle to mark the present tense is the most common of a number of compound tenses that can be used to express varying senses of tense and aspect.

Syriac also employs derived verb stems such as are present in other Semitic languages. These are regular modifications of the verb's root to express other changes in meaning.

The basic G-stem or "Peal" conjugation of "to write" in the perfect and imperfect is as follows:

Phonology

Phonologically, like the other Northwest Semitic languages, Syriac has 22 consonants. The consonantal phonemes are:

Phonetically, there is some variation in the pronunciation of Syriac in its various forms. The various Modern Eastern Aramaic vernaculars have quite different pronunciations, and these sometimes influence how the classical language is pronounced, for example, in public prayer. Classical Syriac has two major streams of pronunciation: western and eastern.

Consonants 
Syriac shares with Aramaic a set of lightly contrasted stop/fricative pairs. In different variations of a certain lexical root, a root consonant might exist in stop form in one variation and fricative form in another. In the Syriac alphabet, a single letter is used for each pair. Sometimes a dot is placed above the letter (quššāyā "strengthening"; equivalent to a dagesh in Hebrew) to mark that the stop pronunciation is required, and a dot is placed below the letter (rukkāḵā "softening") to mark that the fricative pronunciation is required. The pairs are:
 Voiced labial pair –  and 
 Voiced velar pair –  and 
 Voiced dental pair –  and 
 Voiceless labial pair –  and 
 Voiceless velar pair –  and 
 Voiceless dental pair –  and 

Like some Semitic languages, Syriac too has emphatic consonants, and it has three of them. These are consonants that have a coarticulation in the pharynx or slightly higher. The set consists of:
 Pharyngealized voiceless dental stop – 
 Pharyngealized voiceless alveolar fricative – 
 Voiceless uvular stop –  (historically emphatic variant of )

There are two pharyngeal fricatives, another class of consonants typically found in Semitic languages.
 Voiceless pharyngeal fricative – 
 Voiced pharyngeal fricative – 

Syriac also has a rich array of sibilants:
 Voiced alveolar fricative – 
 Voiceless alveolar fricative – 
 Pharyngealized voiceless alveolar fricative – 
 Voiceless postalveolar sibilant –

Vowels 
As with most Semitic languages, the vowels of Syriac are mostly subordinated to consonants. Especially in the presence of an emphatic consonant, vowels tend to become mid-centralised.

Classical Syriac had the following distinguishable vowels:

In eastern dialects, there is more fluidity in the pronunciation of front vowels, with some speakers distinguishing five qualities of such vowels, and others only distinguishing three. Vowel length is generally not important: close vowels tend to be longer than open vowels.

In almost all dialects, the full sets of possible diphthongs collapses into two or three actual pronunciations:
  usually becomes , but the western dialect has 
 , further, sometimes monophthongized to 
  usually becomes 
 , further, sometimes monophthongized to

See also

Notes

References

Sources

 
 
 
 
 
 
 
 
 
 
 
 
 
 
 
 
 
 
 
 
 
 
 
 
 
 
 
 
 
 
 
 
 
 
 
 
 
 
 
 
 
 
 
 
 
 
 
 
 
 
 
 
 
 
 
 
 
 
 
 
 
 
 
 
 
 
 
 
 
 
 
 
 
 
 
 
 
 

 
 
 
 
 
 
 
 
 Rudder, Joshua.  Learn to Write Aramaic: A Step-by-Step Approach to the Historical & Modern Scripts. n.p.: CreateSpace Independent Publishing Platform, 2011. 220 pp.   Includes the Estrangela (pp. 59–113), Madnhaya (pp. 191–206), and the Western Serto (pp. 173–190) scripts.

External links

 YouTube video: Associate professor Svante Lundgren explains the history and origin of the term "Syriac" (Suryoyo/Suroyo)
 
 Syriac traditional pronunciation
 Aramaic Dictionary (lexicon and concordance)
 Syriac at ScriptSource.com
 The Comprehensive Aramaic Lexicon
 Syriac Studies Reference Library, Harold B. Lee Library, Brigham Young University
 
 Leshono Suryoyo - Die traditionelle Aussprache des Westsyrischen - The traditional pronunciation of Western Syriac
 
 

 
Languages attested from the 1st century
Aramaic languages
Classical languages
Endangered Afroasiatic languages
Languages of Iraq
Languages of Lebanon
Languages of Syria
Christian liturgical languages
Syriac Christianity
Semitic languages
Languages of Kurdistan
ta:சிரியாக் மொழி